Salem Ablo (born 20 April 1991) is a Libyan footballer who plays as a midfielder.

International career

International goals
Scores and results list Libya's goal tally first.

References

External links
 

1991 births
Living people
Libyan footballers
Libyan expatriate footballers
Libya international footballers
Association football forwards
Al-Ahli SC (Tripoli) players
CS Hammam-Lif players
Al-Madina SC players
Tunisian Ligue Professionnelle 1 players
People from Tripoli, Libya
Libyan expatriate sportspeople in Tunisia
Expatriate footballers in Tunisia
Libyan Premier League players
Libya A' international footballers
2018 African Nations Championship players